Duisans is a commune in the Pas-de-Calais department in the Hauts-de-France region of France.

Geography
The small river Gy, a tributary of the Scarpe river, flows through the village.

Population

Places of interest
 The church of St. Leger, dating from the fifteenth century.
 The eighteenth-century chateau, built by Antoine-Guillaume Dubois de Hanovre.
 Two 17th-century chapels.

 A war cemetery with c.2,500 graves outside the village

See also
Communes of the Pas-de-Calais department

References

External links

 Website of the château de Duisans 

Communes of Pas-de-Calais